The Lazarus Contract is a Deathstroke/ Titans (superheroes led by Nightwing)/  Teen Titans Crossover event featuring Deathstroke and the Flash in the DC Comics. The story revolves around Deathstroke trying to steal the Flashes' powers to travel back in time to save his son. The crossover received generally positive reviews for the plot and artstyle, however the ending received some criticism.

Synopsis 
Years ago, Deathstroke and his son Grant Wilson were fighting against the Teen Titans (Robin, Kid Flash, Garth, Red Arrow, Wonder Girl, and Omen) where Grant nearly kills Robin when he suddenly has a heart attack. Kid Flash tries to save Ravager, but is too late. Deathstroke blames Grant's death on the original Teen Titans, and tells them they will all pay.

In the current day, Slade wakes up in the hospital after his beating from Jericho with his friend Billy Wintergreen by his side. Deathstroke remembers Wally West now (due to Wally being saved by the Flash in DC Rebirth from Doctor Manhattan) and leaves the hospital. The Titans (adult versions of the original Teen Titans) are fighting against henchmen hired by Deathstroke in New York when Wally is captured. Wally wakes up hooked to a machine and starts revealing his secrets while running. He realizes that it was Slade who captured him and used a verbal laxative to make Wally spill his secrets. Slade offers Wally a deal, help Slade go back in time and save his son, and he will stop being Deathstroke.

Lilith realizes Nightwing is hiding something in the Titans tower. Wally refuses, saying that Grant died because of the serum that H.I.V.E. gave him (the serum was different from Slade Wilson's serum) and going back in time is too dangerous. Wally tries persuading Slade that he needs to move on, but Slade merely repeats his proposition. Wally refuses again, and Deathstroke is not that surprised, saying he knew Wally would refuse, and reveals he had a backup plan: an imprisoned Kid Flash.

Kid Flash is surprised how the new Flash has the same name as he does, and Deathstroke shocks Wally unconscious. Deathstroke had pretended that he needed help with his car when Kid Flash tries to help him. Meanwhile, the Teen Titans (Damian Wayne, Aqualad, Starfire, Raven, and Beast Boy) realize Kid Flash is missing when Kid Flash's tracer is inexplicably found on Damian's costume. The Titans and the Teen Titans work together to find the two Flashes. Deathstroke successfully persuades Kid Flash to help him go back in time to save his son. However, when the Titans and Teen Titans arrived, Deathstroke tricked Kid Flash into stealing his speed alongside some of Wally's.

Wally chases after Slade, and Slade reveals to him that in the past, Slade made a truce with Dick Grayson, if he trains Rose Wilson to be a hero with his morals, then Slade will not attack the original Teen Titans, calling it a Lazarus Contract. If Dick Grayson refuses or fails to teach Rose, Slade will try to kill them once again. Slade tells Wally that even without his speed, Slade is still one of the best mercenaries on the planet, while Wally is nothing without his speed, which causes Wally to run away. Damian insults and criticizes Kid Flash for trusting Deathstroke, and starts to lose his speed. The two teams try to find Deathstroke, leaving Kid Flash and Aqualad behind (with Raven criticizing Damian's behavior).

Wally manages to persuade Jericho to help them, while Wallace tries calling Flash and the Justice League for help. Wintergreen gives Wallace and Aqualad a ride, while Deathstroke successfully travels to the past and sees his son again.

In the past, its revealed that Grant got his powers from his friends who worked for H.I.V.E and he idolized Deathstroke. Deathstroke unmasks himself, and Grant is horrified that his idol is his father who left him when he was young, and tries fighting him but Deathstroke easily beats him up. Wally and Jericho run around in circles to create a time vortex while Raven's chronokinesis and Starfire's energy bolts will help stabilize the time vortex so everyone can travel to the past. The current Teen Titans and the adult Titans meet the original Teen Titans when they were young. Damian uses a palm technique called Commoto Cordis on past Wally West to make his heart stop. This will cause current Wally to start fading, which means Deathstroke will lose his connection to his super speed (since he used his speed to travel to the past). In the past, Grant Wilson vanishes in front of him, with Deathstroke in shock.

Wallace gets his speed back, and past Wally recovers which causes the time vortex to end. Deathstroke arrives in the present and plans to go into the Speed Force to go even farther back in time, and after he is done he will kill everyone. The adult Wally appears again, and tells everyone that if Deathstroke goes in the Speed Force, he can't get out because he is too inexperienced. Everyone is okay with this outcome, except for Kid Flash, who says that they're acting like Deathstroke, and goes back in the Speed force to save Slade.

Wally can go back in the Speed Force, but he needs help from everyone since he isn't fast enough thanks to Damian. Nightwing tells Omen to create a psychic link with Raven, and Raven will use her powers to astrally project into Jericho, and Jericho will use his powers to transfer his conscious into Wally, which will create a near communication field (that links the Teen Titans and Titans with the exception of Damian) that will give Wally extra speed.

Wally and Kid Flash enter the Speed Force, but Raven receives pain due to her being an empath and Wally feeling guilty that he ran away from Deathstroke. Aqualad arrives and convinces Robin to help Raven. Robin tells Raven that she's okay,  and no one will hurt her. A few minutes later Deathstroke, Wally and Kid Flash get out of the Speed Force and land in front of them. The Teen Titans and Titans plan to fight Deathstroke, but Deathstroke explained that he saw things in the Speed Force they wouldn't understand, and he lost his drive to kill them. Deathstroke drops his sword and mask before walking away.

In the epilogue, Damian fires Kid Flash because he trusted Deathstroke and nearly put innocent lives at risk. Wally learns that due to Damian nearly killing his past self, his heart needs to have a pacemaker and he can't run as fast anymore. Deathstroke decides to create his own version of Teen Titans that includes Wintergreen, Jericho, and Rose Wilson.

Reception 
The crossover received generally positive reviews. However, critics noted that the ending was anticlimactic.

According to review aggregator Comic Book Roundup, Titans Vol 3 Issue 11 received a score of 7.9 out of 10 based on 22 reviews.

According to Comic Book Roundup, Teen Titans Vol 6 Issue 8 received a score of 7.5 out of 10 based on 19 reviews.

According to Comic book Roundup, Deathstroke Vol 4 Issue 19 received a score of 7.5 out of 10 based on 20 reviews.

According to Comic Book Roundup, Teen Titans: Lazarus Contract Special #1 received a score of 7.3 out of 10 based on 24 reviews.

According to comic book roundup, Deathstroke Vol 4 Issue 20 received a score of 8.2 out of 10 based on 10 reviews.

Collected edition

References

External links